Hylarana, commonly known as golden-backed frogs, is a genus of true frogs found in tropical Asia. It was formerly considered highly diverse, containing around 84 to 96 valid species, but taxonomic revision resulted in a major change in the contents of the genus, and today it is recognised as containing just four species.

Description
Hylarana are small to large-sized frogs. The nares (nostrils) are oval in shape and covered by a flap of skin. The tympanum is visible but is not covered by a supratympanic fold. Vomerine teeth and a pineal ocellus (parietal eye) are present. The toes are webbed, but the fingers are not.

Distribution
Former members of the genus Hylarana ranged from Sri Lanka to the Western Ghats of India, through Nepal and southern China and Taiwan, down to Southeast Asia to the Philippines and Papua New Guinea, in Northern Australia, and tropical Africa. Following taxonomic revisions, the genus is actually restricted to Southern and southeast Asia.

Taxonomy
Hylarana belongs to the subfamily Raninae of the true frog family Ranidae. Hylarana was previously considered to be a subgenus of the genus Rana. It was recognized as a distinct genus in 2005. Several genera were further split from Hylarana in 2006, and then treated again as junior synonyms of Hylarana. In 2015, Oliver et al. performed a major taxonomic re-assessment of Hylarana. Their taxonomic reassessment left just four of the former 80–100 species within the genus Hylarana sensu stricto. The rest were transferred to Abavorana, Amnirana, Chalcorana, Humerana, Hydrophylax, Indosylvirana, Papurana, Pulchrana, and Sylvirana.

Species
Formerly, the genus consisted of around 84 to 96 valid species. Following a major re-classification, only four species are now recognised in the genus Hylarana:
Hylarana erythraea (Schlegel, 1837) - common green frog, green paddy frog, leaf frog, or red-eared frog
Hylarana macrodactyla  Günther, 1858 - Guangdong frog, three-striped grass frog, or marbled slender frog
Hylarana taipehensis (Van Denburgh, 1909) - two-striped grass frog
Hylarana tytleri Theobald, 1868

Following this revision, the genus assignment of several Hylarana species is now uncertain:
"Hylarana" chitwanensis (Das, 1998)
"Hylarana" garoensis (Boulenger, 1920)
"Hylarana" latouchii (Boulenger, 1899)
"Hylarana" margariana Anderson, 1879
"Hylarana" montivaga (Smith, 1921)
"Hylarana" persimilis (Van Kampen, 1923)

See also

Rana

References

 
Amphibian genera
Amphibians of Asia
True frogs
Taxa named by Johann Jakob von Tschudi